The Insomniax (USA) is an American songwriting/music production duo made up of Emile Ghantous and Erik Nelson. 

The two met in 1994 while Nelson was the owner of a local recording studio and Ghantous was a local up-and-coming music producer. After collaborating for some projects, they formed the successful Chicago-based duo that gave big hits to JLS, Jason Derulo, Che'Nelle, JoJo, Fat Joe, Boyz II Men, R. Kelly, Frankie J, O-Town, and others.

"The Insomniax" choice for a name is a reference to long hours in the studio, well after midnight.

References

Songwriting teams
Record production duos
Record producers from Illinois
Alternative dance musical groups